Gabriela D. Lemus was the executive director of the Progressive Congress, the non-profit partner organization affiliated with members of the Progressive Caucus. Previously she was the Director of the Office of Public Engagement at the Department of Labor from 2009 to 2013. She was born in Mexico City on January 23, 1963, to Guillermo Felix Lemus Covarrubias and Brenda Lemus Marcellini. She holds a BS in International Studies and Business Administration from St. Mary of the Woods College and a Ph.D. from the University of Miami. In 2012 she was appointed to the board of the University of the District of Columbia.

She has been mentioned as a possible future Secretary of Labor.

Background
Lemus' father was an international business executive. During her childhood she visited many countries and spoke several languages fluently. This early exposure to international life led her to pursue degrees in international studies both at the undergraduate and doctoral levels.

Prior to her work at the Department of Labor, from 2007 to 2009 Lemus was the first woman to be the executive director at the Labor Council for Latin American Advancement. During her tenure at LCLAA, she helped co-found the National Latino Coalition on Climate Change (NLCCC) and was a Commissioner for the Commission to Engage African-Americans on Climate Change (CEAAC). Gabriela was also the first woman to chair the National Hispanic Leadership Agenda (NHLA) from 2008-2009. She served 3-year terms on the advisory boards of both the Washington Office on Latin America from 2005-2008 and the United States Labor Education in the Americas Project (USLEAP) from 2006-2009. Lemus was Director of Policy and Legislation at the League of United Latin American Citizens from 2000 to 2007 where she founded the LULAC Democracy Initiative, a national Hispanic civic participation campaign and founded Latinos for a Secure Retirement - a national campaign to fight against the privatization of Social Security.

Lemus has appeared in both English and Spanish language media outlets, including CNN, CNN en Español, C-SPAN, MSNBC, Hardball with Chris Matthews, Your World with Neil Cavuto, Univision and Telemundo, among others.

Awards and honors
She received her doctorate in International Relations from the University of Miami in 1998.

See also
 NHLA

External links

References

1963 births
Living people
Mexican emigrants to the United States
Saint Mary-of-the-Woods College alumni
United States Department of Labor officials
University of Miami alumni